Keratoderma blennorrhagicum etymologically meaning keratinized (kerato-) skin (derma-) mucousy (blenno-) discharge (-rrhagia) (also called keratoderma blennorrhagica) are skin lesions commonly found on the palms and soles but which may spread to the scrotum, scalp and trunk. The lesions may resemble psoriasis.

Keratoderma blennorrhagicum is commonly seen as an additional feature of reactive arthritis in almost 15% of male patients. The appearance is usually of a vesico-pustular waxy lesion with a yellow brown colour. These lesions may join to form larger crusty plaques with desquamating edges.

See also
 Keratoderma
 Keratosis
 Blennorrhea
 List of cutaneous conditions

References

External links 

Psoriasis